NCCM may refer to:

 National Council of Canadian Muslims in Canada
 Network configuration and change management in information technology